Hot Shots is a 1956 comedy film starring The Bowery Boys. The film was released on December 23, 1956 by Monogram Pictures and is the forty-third film in the series. It was directed by Jean Yarbrough and written by Jack Townley.

Plot
A spoiled child television star steals Sach and Duke's car. After retrieving the vehicle, the duo "teach the kid a lesson". Television executives, who are disgruntled by the child, are impressed by the duo who are then hired to watch after the boy. The child's uncle/manager is not happy with Sach and Duke's influence over the child so he gets the two fired and then kidnaps the boy for ransom, to cover up his stealing the boy's earnings. Sach and Duke then rescue him.

Cast

The Bowery Boys
 Huntz Hall as Horace Debussy 'Sach' Jones
 Stanley Clements as Stanislaus 'Duke' Coveleskie
 David Gorcey as Charles 'Chuck' Anderson
 Jimmy Murphy as Myron

Remaining cast
 Phil Phillips as Joey Munroe
 Joi Lansing as Connie Forbes
 Queenie Smith as Mrs. Kate Kelly
 Robert Shayne as P.M. Morley
 Mark Dana as George Slater
 Henry Rowland as Karl
 Isabel Randolph as Mrs. Taylor
 Ray Walker as Capt. W.K. Wells
 Emory Parnell as B. L.Taylor

Production
Hot Shots is noted as being one of the last seven titles in the series filmed after the departure of Leo Gorcey.

Introduction film for spirited child actor Phil Phillips who totally disappeared from the scene after a spurt of film and television credits running eight years in length.

Home media
Warner Archives released the film on made-to-order DVD in the United States as part of "The Bowery Boys, Volume Three" on October 1, 2013.

References

External links
 
 
 
 

1956 comedy films
1956 films
Bowery Boys films
American black-and-white films
American comedy films
Allied Artists films
Films directed by Jean Yarbrough
1950s English-language films
1950s American films